Strange Flavour is an independent computer game software developer based in United Kingdom. They currently (2017) develop and publish games for iOS, AppleTV and MacOS systems, with games on the iOS, AppleTV and Mac App Stores. Previously, Strange Flavour has also developed games for the Xbox 360.

Strange Flavour frequently collaborated with Freeverse Software with whom they won an Apple Design Award (Most Innovative Mac OS X product) in 2004 for the game ToySight.

Games

 Airburst Extreme (2004) Published by Freeverse
 ToySight Gold (2004-2005) Published by Freeverse	
 TotemBall (2006)	
 Spyglass Board Games (2007)		
 Flick Fishing (2008) Published by Freeverse	
 Plank (2008) Published by Freeverse	
 SlotZ Racer(2009) Published by Freeverse	
 Warpack: Grunts (2009) (Published by Freeverse)	
 SlotZ Racer 2 HD (2011)	
 SlotZ Racer Caterham Special (2012)
 SlotZ Racer Zenos Special (2014) 	
 Any Landing (2013)
 Apple Bob (2013)(Developed in partnership with Pixel Pyro)	
 Fast Fishing (2015) 
 Fish! (2015) 
 Tiny TrackZ (2015) 
 SpinnYwingS (2017)
 AiRburst (2018)
 Face Candy (2018)
 Flick Fishing Redux (2018) (Fish! renamed to Flick Fishing Redux)
 Face Word (2019)

Developed and self published as Strange Flavour, before the company Strange Flavour Ltd. was officially formed in 2004
 Bushfire (1999)
 Airburst (2001)

References

Mobile game companies
Video game companies established in 2004
Macintosh software companies
Video game companies of the United Kingdom
Video game development companies